The Regulatory Reform Act may refer to either of two Acts of the Parliament of the United Kingdom:

Regulatory Reform Act 2001 (2001 c. 6)
Legislative and Regulatory Reform Act 2006 (2006 c. 51)

See also
List of regulatory reform orders